Olaf Søyland (born 28 July 1952) is a Norwegian sprint canoer who competed in the mid to late 1970s. He was born in Flekkefjord. He won three medals at the ICF Canoe Sprint World Championships with two golds (K-2 1000 m: 1979, K-4 10000 m: 1975) and a silver (K-2 1000 m: 1978).
Søyland also finished sixth in the K-4 1000 m event at the 1976 Summer Olympics in Montreal.

References

1952 births
Canoeists at the 1976 Summer Olympics
Living people
Norwegian male canoeists
Olympic canoeists of Norway
People from Flekkefjord
ICF Canoe Sprint World Championships medalists in kayak
Sportspeople from Agder